Bishop Amat Memorial High School is a  co-ed Catholic high school serving the San Gabriel Valley in the Roman Catholic Archdiocese of Los Angeles, and was founded in 1957. The coeducational student body comprises approximately 1,520 students in grades 9 through 12, making Bishop Amat the largest private high school in Los Angeles County.

History
The school is named for the first Bishop of Monterey-Los Angeles, the Most Reverend Thaddeus Amat y Brusi, who served as the ordinary of Los Angeles from 1853 to 1878. He founded some of the first schools in Los Angeles and invited the Society of Saint Vincent de Paul to open St. Vincent's College, which was the predecessor to Loyola Marymount University. Bishop Amat Memorial High School was formally dedicated to his memory in October 1959.

Academics 
Bishop Amat offers both Advanced Placement and  International Baccalaureate courses.

Campus

The campus site has grown over the years with the present 200 and 500 wings added in 1959. The gymnasium was added in 1962, the stadium in 1965 and the 300 wing in 1966. In 1973, the school formally became co-educational, with a single administrative structure. A building dedicated to the performing arts was completed in 1982. Four classrooms, including a full computer lab, were completed in 1988. A second computer lab was added in 1993, a refurbished physics lab in 1994 and the Brutocao Library in 1995. In 2000, a new covered lunch structure was built completed with integrated sound system and bbq pit.

In 2002, the school undertook a major campus renovation with plans for the replacement of the Tate Duff Memorial gymnasium. On March 16, 2003, demolition commenced on the facility. A leveled site groundbreaking for the new facility was held on April 16, 2003, with Bishop Zavala conducting the ceremony. On May 16, 2004, the living Rosary was held as the first activity in the new facility. The new Student Activity Center houses a main pavilion which seats 1600 spectators for Masses, assemblies, rallies and basketball and volleyball contests. New locker rooms for boys (down stairs) and girls (upstairs) are included as well as a lunchroom, dance studio, weight room facility and athletic and coaching offices. An equipment room and seminar room enhanced the many uses of the facility. In 2008 the facility was named in honor of Bishop Amat's first President, Monsignor Aidan Carroll who developed the concept of the center and raised the money to pay its cost.

Sports

Bishop Amat participates in the Southern Section of the California Interscholastic Federation, fielding 42 teams in 15 sports, 

Amat Lancers have won four state championships - girls' basketball (2), Girls Cross Country (1), and Boys Cross Country (1).

The Lancer girls' basketball team won the state championship in 2005 and 2006. The girls' cross country team won the state championship in 2015. The boys' cross country team won the state championship in 2014. Both the Boys and Girls Cross Country teams compete regularly in the Nike Portland and Cross Nationals in Portland, Oregon. 

The school was selected as national champion by Collegiate Baseball Magazine twice (in 2001 and 2002). As of 2014 It was the only school to have been selected twice. The baseball program has won the National Classic game four times.

The Bishop Amat football program won the CIF-SS championships in 1961, 1970, 1971 , 1992, 1995. The 1992 Lancer football team won the Reebok Bowl  which was the first-ever championship between the CIF-Southern Section champion and the Los Angeles CIF city champion.

Notable alumni

Troy Auzenne, NFL player, Class of 1987
Jeff Banks, college football coach
Eric Bieniemy, NFL player and coach, Class of 1987
Caprice Bourret, Model, fashion designer and actress, Class of 1989
Ralph Brown, NFL player, Class of 1996
France Córdova, president, Purdue University, Class of 1965
Jeanne Córdova, writer and LGBT activist
Charlene Mae Gonzales Bonnin-Muhlach, Miss Philippines in 1994 Miss Universe, top 6 finalist
Dan Haren, MLB pitcher, 3-time All-Star, Class of 1998
Pat Haden, USC and NFL quarterback, sportscaster, USC Athletic Director, Class of 1971
John Jackson, NFL player, sportscaster
Brian Kelly,  professional football player for Edmonton Eskimos, 1979-1987; elected to Canadian Football Hall of Fame 1991), Class of 1974
Mike Lamb, MLB player, Class of 1993
Daylon McCutcheon, NFL player
Paul McDonald, NFL player, quarterback for USC's 1978 national championship team
John McKay, Jr., USC assistant athletic director, NFL player, son of football coach John McKay), Class of 1971
Tamara Mello, actress
Kory Minor, NFL player
Carlos Pascual, U.S. Ambassador to Mexico, Special Envoy and Coordinator for International Energy Affairs, Class of 1976
P. J. Pilittere, baseball coach
Sheldon Price, NFL player, Class of 2008
William Robinson, NFL player
Mazio Royster, NFL player
Rio Ruiz, MLB player, Class of 2012
Brian Russell, NFL player, Class of 1996
Maria Sachs, member of Florida State Senate, Class of 1967
John Sciarra, NFL player, All-American quarterback at UCLA, played in 1976 Rose Bowl in which UCLA upset favored Ohio State, Class of 1972, inducted into College Football Hall of Fame 2014
Scheana Shay, actress, Class of 2002
Ryan Smith, NFL player, cornerback for University of Florida national championship team
Danny Walton, MLB player, Class of 1965
Adrian Young, football player
David Denson, first professional baseball player to come out as gay
Daniel Zamora, baseball player

References

External links 
 Bishop Amat Memorial High School web site

Roman Catholic secondary schools in Los Angeles County, California
La Puente, California
1957 establishments in California
Educational institutions established in 1957
Catholic secondary schools in California